Comic Book Tattoo  is an Eisner award and Harvey Award–winning anthology graphic novel made up of fifty-one stories, each based on or inspired by a song by American singer-songwriter Tori Amos, published by Image Comics in 2008. Rantz Hoseley, longtime friend of Amos, served as the book's editor. Together, Hoseley and Amos gathered eighty different artists to collaborate on the book. Comic Book Tattoo includes an introduction by another longtime friend of Amos, Neil Gaiman, creator of The Sandman series.

Background
From the start, it was decided that Comic Book Tattoo would not contain comic book versions of music videos for Amos's songs, nor illustrations created from literal interpretations of Amos's lyrics. Of her role in the project, editor Hoseley said, "It was very important to [Amos] that she see how the different creators were treating 'her girls' (the songs), but at the same time, not tying the creator's hands or make them feel restricted in any way and making sure that they felt the freedom to tell the kind of story that they felt strongly about." When approached to contribute to the project, the graphic artists were asked to create a story that reflects that which the songs make them feel.

About the finished collection, Amos said, "I have been surprised, excited and pleasantly shocked by these comics that are extensions of the songs that I have loved and therefore welcome these amazing stories of pictures and words because they are uncompromisingly inspiring. It shows you thought is a powerful, formidable essence and can have a breathtaking domino effect."

The title of the book comes from a lyric in Amos' song "Flying Dutchman".

Stories

* – Song is a B-side from aforementioned album
(C) – Artist served as a colorist
(L) – Artist served as a letterer

Editions
Comic Book Tattoo was initially made available in three formats, with the addition of another special edition released in November 2008. The available versions are;

 Paperback

 Hardback

 Limited Edition Hardback (Leather bound encased, signed by Tori Amos and uniquely numbered)

 Special Edition Hardback (With a slipcase cover)

Awards and recognition
 2009:
 Eisner Award for Best Anthology: Comic Book Tattoo: Narrative Art Inspired by the Lyrics and Music of Tori Amos, edited by Rantz Hoseley (Image)
 Eisner Award nomination for Best Publication Design: Comic Book Tattoo, designed by Tom Muller, art direction by Rantz Hoseley (Image)
 Harvey Award for Best Anthology: Comic Book Tattoo, edited by Rantz Hoseley

See also

Put the Book Back on the Shelf

References

External links
Comic Book Tattoo on ToriAmos.com 
Comic Blog Tattoo, official creators blog 
SHE'S YOUR COMICS: Tori Amos' "Comic Book Tattoo", Comic Book Resources, April 3, 2008
CCI: "Comic Book Tattoo" Inspires New Amos Music, Comic Book Resources, July 27, 2008
CBR TV: Tori Amos, Comic Book Resources, August 4, 2008
The Second Supper Review of "Comic Book Tattoo"
2009 Eisner Award nominees 
2009 Harvey Award winners
Designer Tom Muller discusses the design of Comic Book Tattoo

2008 graphic novels
2008 comics debuts
Cultural depictions of rock musicians
Comics based on musical groups 
Image Comics graphic novels
Tori Amos
Eisner Award winners for Best Anthology